Sekolah Menengah Pertama Negeri 1 Cilegon (English: State Junior High School 1 Cilegon) or nicknamed SMPN 1 Cilegon is a public junior high school situated in Jalan Cut Nyak Dien No.34 Cilegon, Banten, Indonesia.

History 
Firstly, this school opened in January 1958 in Pegantungan, Cilegon, was originally remote classes from the SMP Negeri Serang.
Then in the 70's, the school relocated to Jalan Stasiun (Jalan Cut Nyak Dien) with the name of SMP Cilegon, which at the time was a former prison built by the military region command of Maulana Yusuf. so it known by the name of SMP Maulana Yusuf.
In 1982, the government opened more schools in Cilegon, since then SMP Cilegon become SMPN 1 Cilegon.

School Song 
Mars SMPN 1 Cilegon
Datang-datanglah hari bahagia bagi kami semua
Dapat belajar dengan gembira demi masa mendatang
Terimakasih pada semua ibu-bapak guruku
Yang telah rela berkorban, membimbing kami semua

 Majulah maju
 Tuntutlah ilmu bagi nusa dan bangsa
 Majulah maju
 SMP Satu.. SMP Cilegon pasti jaya

 Majulah maju
 Tuntutlah ilmu bagi nusa dan bangsa
 Majulah maju
 SMP Satu.. SMP Cilegon pasti jaya

English Translation:
Come a happy day for us all
we can learn with joy for the future
Thanks to all Mr and Mrs Teachers
That has been willing to sacrifice, to guide us all

 Go forward
 Seek knowledge for homeland
 Go forward
 SMP 1.. SMP Cilegon is definitely victorious

 Go forward
 Seek knowledge for homeland
 Go forward
 SMP 1.. SMP Cilegon is definitely victorious

Address 
 Sekolah Menengah Pertama Negeri 1 Cilegon
 Jalan Cut Nyak Dien No. 34
 Cilegon, Banten
 Phone : +62254 391102

External links 
 http://smpn1-cilegon.sch.id/
 http://refsp.data.kemdikbud.go.id/ref_data/tabs.php?npsn=20606260

Schools in Indonesia
Education in Banten